HitPredict is a database of high confidence protein-protein interactions.

See also
 Protein-protein interaction
 BioGRID

References

External links
 http://hintdb.hgc.jp/htp/

Biological databases
Proteomics
Biophysics
Systems biology